Météo-France is the French national meteorological service.

Organisation 
The organisation was established by decree in June 1993 and is a department of the Ministry of Transportation. It is headquartered in Paris but many domestic operations have been decentralised to Toulouse. Its budget of around €300 million is funded by state grants, aeronautic royalties and sale of commercial services.

Météo-France has a particularly strong international presence, and is the French representative at the World Meteorological Organization. The organisation is a leading member of EUMETSAT, responsible for the procurement of Meteosat weather satellites. It is also member of the Institut au service du spatial, de ses applications et technologies. It also a critical national weather service member of the ECMWF and hosts one of two major centres of the IFS numerical weather prediction model widely used worldwide.

Worldwide 
In addition to its operations in metropolitan France, the agency provides forecasts and warnings for the French overseas départements and collectivités. It has four sub-divisions based in Martinique (with further divisions serving Guadeloupe and French Guiana), New Caledonia, French Polynesia and Réunion. Some of these sub-divisions have particularly important international responsibilities:
 For example, the French Guiana office based at Cayenne-Rochambeau airport maintains facilities at the ESA/CNES Centre Spatial Guyanais spaceport in Kourou which assists with launch campaigns of the Ariane rocket.
 The Réunion sub-division is the official World Meteorological Organisation designated Regional Specialized Meteorological Centre (RSMC) for the provision of forecasts and warnings of tropical cyclones in the south-west Indian Ocean.
 The French Polynesia sub-division, whilst not the official RSMC for tropical cyclones in the South Pacific, has been mandated by the WMO to issue forecasts and warnings of tropical cyclones for the neighbouring British Pitcairn Islands.

Naming
Although the original name of the organisation was "Météo-France", with acute accents and normal French capitalisation, all the publications made by Météo-France are now using the name written with capitals only, without any accents, everywhere the name is used as a trademark for the products and services delivered by the national organisation.

This trademark decision reflects the need to have its name not altered in electronic documents due to transcoding errors, and to allow easier international references in many languages, including when referencing the organisation itself (in copyright notices for example, or when citing sources).

The name in capitals or with normal capitalisation with accents is protected internationally under trademark law, and as an organisation name. Some non-binding information documents sometimes forget the hyphen in the name (but the hyphen is normally required).

See also 

EUMETSAT (international European organisation)
 Météo-France heat alert

References

External links 

Météo-France (In French)
Météo-France Antille-Guyane
Météo-France La Réunion
Météo-France Nouvelle-Calédonie
Météo-France Polynésie Française
Météo-France on Top 500
Meteo France International
METNEXT
Météo-France Régie
Meteorage
PREDICT Services

Governmental meteorological agencies in Europe
Regional Specialized Meteorological Centres
Météo-France